Joaquín Miquel Casas (21 July 1904 – 1929) was a Spanish runner. He competed at the 1924 Summer Olympics in the 3000 m and 5000 m and at the 1928 Summer Olympics in the 400 m and 800 m events, but failed to reach the finals.

References

External links
 

1904 births
1929 deaths
Spanish male middle-distance runners
Athletes (track and field) at the 1924 Summer Olympics
Athletes (track and field) at the 1928 Summer Olympics
Olympic athletes of Spain
20th-century Spanish people